Iain Lindsay Philip (born 9 June 1958 in Falkirk) was a Scottish cricketer. He played cricket between 1986 and 1999. He made his One-day International debut in 1999 at the age of 41 against Australia.

During his cricket-playing career he made 104 appearances for the Scottish cricket team, more than any other player, became the highest-scoring Scottish batsman, and scored more runs than any other batsman in a single innings (234 in 1991).

External links
 Ian Philip at Cricinfo

1958 births
Living people
Scottish cricketers
Scotland One Day International cricketers
Sportspeople from Falkirk
Wicket-keepers